Coelodonta thibetana, the Tibetan woolly rhinoceros, is an extinct species of the genus Coelodonta native to western Himalayas that lived during the middle Pliocene epoch. C. thibetana is known from the holotype IVPP V15908, a partially complete skull including incomplete lower jaw preserved with full dentition. It was first named by Tao Deng, Xiaoming Wang, Mikael Fortelius, Qiang Li, Yang Wang, Zhijie J. Tseng, Gary T. Takeuchi, Joel E. Saylor, Laura K. Säilä and Guangpu Xie in 2011.

Phylogeny 
The descriptors conducted a phylogenetic analysis of the five living rhinoceros species and thirteen extinct species. They qualify following cladogram, where C. thibetana was awarded a basal position within its genus.

References

Pliocene rhinoceroses
Extinct animals of Tibet
Fossil taxa described in 2011
Pleistocene species extinctions
Pliocene mammals of Asia
Taxa named by Tao Deng
Coelodonta